SoDak Con formerly called SoDak Anime Convention, was an annual three-day anime convention held during May/June at the Rushmore Plaza Civic Center in Rapid City, South Dakota. The name of the convention comes from the state that the convention is located in, South Dakota.

Programming
The convention typically offered art, a charity auction, costume contest, fashion, Japanese fashion show, music videos, speakers, table-top gaming, vendors, video games, and a video room.

History
The convention origins date to the Waldenbooks in the Rushmore Mall. In 2011 an auction was held and the proceeds were donated to the Children's Miracle Network. Fifty percent of the attendees in 2013 were not from the area.

Event history

References

External links
SoDak Con Website

Defunct anime conventions
Recurring events established in 2009
2009 establishments in South Dakota
Annual events in South Dakota
Festivals in South Dakota
Tourist attractions in Pennington County, South Dakota
Tourist attractions in Rapid City, South Dakota
Conventions in South Dakota